Minuscule 864 (in the Gregory-Aland numbering) is a 14th-century Greek minuscule manuscript of the New Testament on paper. The manuscript has almost complete marginalia.

Description 

The codex contains the text of the four Gospels on 550 paper leaves (size ), with a catena. The text is written in one column per page, 14 lines per page.

There is also a division according to the smaller Ammonian Sections (in Mark 235, 16:9), without references to the Eusebian Canons.

Synaxarion and Menologion were added in the 15th century.

Text 
The Greek text of the codex is a representative of the Byzantine text-type. Hermann von Soden classified it to the textual family Kx. Kurt Aland the Greek text of the codex placed in Category V.
According to the Claremont Profile Method it represents textual family Kx in Luke 1 and Luke 20. It creates also a textual pair with minuscule 1609. In Luke 10 no profile was made.

History 

C. R. Gregory dated the manuscript to the 14th century. Currently the manuscript is dated by the INTF to the 14th century.

The manuscript once belonged to the Cardinal Antonio Carafa.

The manuscript was added to the list of New Testament manuscripts by Gregory (864e). Gregory saw it in 1886.

Currently the manuscript is housed at the Vatican Library (Gr. 1253), in Rome.

See also 

 List of New Testament minuscules
 Biblical manuscript
 Textual criticism
 Minuscule 863

References

Further reading

External links 
 

Greek New Testament minuscules
14th-century biblical manuscripts
Manuscripts of the Vatican Library